Brian Bermingham is a former Irish Fine Gael politician and former Cork City Council member. He was the Lord Mayor of Cork from 2008 to 2009. He successfully contested 4 local government elections in the Cork South West local electoral area between 1999 and 2009.

Political career
At age 14 he joined Young Fine Gael. He was first elected to Cork City Council in 1979 aside Councillors Donal Counihan, Denis Cregan and Maureen Quill. In 1988, he joined the Progressive Democrats and on 27 June 1991 he was elected into Cork South West with 861 first preference votes (10.41%). After ten years with the Progressive Democrats he moved back to Fine Gael and he went on to contest the 1999 elections, he was elected on 10 June 1999. He was elected onto the City Council again in 2004.

He was elected as Lord Mayor of Cork in June 2008, 40 years after his father John Bermingham, who was elected in 1968. He served as Chairperson for the Cork City Council during this time. In 2009, he hosted a Lord Mayors reception to mark the 125th anniversary of GAA. After a year as Lord Mayor from June 2008 to June 2009 he was succeeded by Fine Gael politician Dara Murphy. He also contested the local elections in Cork South West and was elected in June 2009. He retired and did not contest the 2014 local elections.

References

Living people
Year of birth missing (living people)
Fine Gael politicians
Local councillors in Cork (city)
Lord Mayors of Cork